Justice Gibson may refer to:

Ernest W. Gibson III (1927–2020), associate justice of the Vermont Supreme Court
Fred L. Gibson (1874–1956), associate justice of the Montana Supreme Court
James Gibson (judge) (1902–1992), presiding justice of the New York Supreme Court (4th District), and a judge of the New York Court of Appeals 
John Bannister Gibson (1780–1853), chief justice of the Pennsylvania Supreme Court
Phil S. Gibson (1888–1984), chief justice of the Supreme Court of California
Rankin Gibson (1916-2001), associate justice of the Ohio Supreme Court